Hilmi Murad (1919–1998) was an Egyptian economist and politician who served as the general secretary and vice president of the Socialist Labour Party. In addition, he was one of the ministers of education of Egypt.

Early life and education
Hilmi Murad was born on 7 July 1919 in Cairo. His sister, Amina Murad, was the wife of Kamal Al Din Salah who was assassinated on 16 April 1957 while serving as a consultant to the United Nations in Mogadishu, Somali.

Hilmi Murad graduated from the Faculty of Law at Cairo University in 1939 and received a postgraduate diploma in public law in 1940. He received a PhD from the University of Paris in 1949.

Career
Murad joined the Public Prosecution Office in 1942 and served there until 1946. He worked as a professor of public finance. He served as the vice president of Cairo University. In the 1960s he worked in the UNESCO and then served as the minister of education in the period 1968–1969. He was dismissed from the post by Gamal Abdel Nasser.  

Murad was a member of the socialist party which was established by Ahmad Hussein in the 1940s. Later he became one of the leading figures of the Socialist Labour Party and served as its vice president in the 1980s. He was also one of the contributors of the newspaper Al Shaab. He later joined the New Wafd Party. Murad was one of its three vice presidents and also, headed the parliament group of the party. In addition, he was the spokesperson of the party.

Later years and death
In early October 1993 Hilmi Murad and three other members of the Socialist Labour Party were arrested and detained for three days due to the publication of an article in Al Shaab newspaper which harshly criticized the Egyptian President Hosni Mubarak. Murad died in 1998.

References

20th-century Egyptian economists
1919 births
1998 deaths
Egyptian socialists
Education Ministers of Egypt
Cairo University alumni
Politicians from Cairo
New Wafd Party politicians
University of Paris alumni
Egyptian prisoners and detainees